Thomas Michael John Kempinski (born 24 March 1938) is an English playwright and actor best known for his 1980 play Duet for One, which was a major success in London and New York City, and much revived since. Kempinski also wrote the screenplay for the movie version of Duet for One. In addition, he made minor appearances on numerous British television shows including Dixon of Dock Green and Z-Cars.

Early life and education
Kempinski was born in Hendon and educated at Abingdon School from 1951 to 1956. In 1957 he gained a major scholarship in Modern Languages to Gonville and Caius College, Cambridge, but suffered a breakdown and left after only ten weeks.

Personal life
He was married to the actress Frances de la Tour who starred in the original London production for Duet for One, to the actress Margaret Nolan from 1967 to 1972, and to solicitor Sarah Tingay from 1991.

Plays
In 1967 he played the title role in Charles Wood's Dingo at the Royal Court Theatre.

Selected filmography (actor)
 These Are the Damned (1962) - Ted
 Do Be Careful Boys (1964) - (voice)
 Othello (1965) - Sailor / Senators-Soldiers-Cypriots
 Stranger in the House (1967) - Shop assistant (uncredited)
 The Whisperers (1967) - 2nd Young Man
 Mrs. Brown, You've Got a Lovely Daughter (1968) - Hobart
 The Committee (1968) - Victim
 Moon Zero Two (1969) - 2nd Officer
 Taste of Excitement (1969) - French Police Officer
 Praise Marx and Pass the Ammunition (1970) - Designer
 The Reckoning (1970) - Brunzy
 Doctor in Trouble (1970) - Stedman Green
 The McKenzie Break (1970) - Lt. Schmidt
 Gumshoe (1971) - Psychiatrist
 Adult Fun (1972) - Plainclothes Policeman

See also
 List of Old Abingdonians

References

External links

1938 births
English dramatists and playwrights
Living people
English male dramatists and playwrights
People educated at Abingdon School
Workers Revolutionary Party (UK) members
Alumni of Gonville and Caius College, Cambridge